was the name of Japanese cargo ship owned by Nippon Yusen Kaisha (NYK), Tokyo.

The name Ōmi Maru derives from Ōmi province.

Earlier vessel

The first NYK ship named Ōmi Maru was part of the fleet between 1885 and 1910. It was the sister ship to the Yamashiro Maru

Omi Maru 1884 1885 Built by Armstrong Mitchell, Low Walker Yard Number 468
Purchased from Kiodo Unyu K.K. Tokyo, 1910 scrapped Osaka.

Yamashiro Maru Built by Armstrong Mitchell, Low Walker Yard Number 467.1884 1885. 
Purchased from Kiodo Unyu K.K. Tokyo, 1910 scrapped Osaka

1912-1942 vessel

In 1912, Ōmi Maru entered NYK service along with vessels which were known as sister ships in the NYK fleet.

In the early years of what became World War II, Ōmi Maru was commandeered by the Imperial Japanese Navy for use as a troopship. The ship was torpedoed and sunk south of the Caroline Islands by the submarine USS Triton on December 28, 1942.

Notes

References

 Peattie, Mark R. (1988). Nanʻyo: the Rise and Fall of the Japanese in Micronesia, 1885-1945. Honolulu: University of Hawaii Press. ; 
 Ponsonby-Fane, Richard.  (1964). Visiting Famous Shrines in Japan. Kyoto: Ponsonby-Fane Memorial Society.

External links
 Ships List:  Ships of Nippon Yusen Kaisha K.K 
 Wreck Site:  SS Omi Maru (+1942)

1912 ships
Ships of the NYK Line
Auxiliary ships of the Imperial Japanese Navy
World War II merchant ships of Japan
Ships sunk by American submarines
World War II shipwrecks in the Pacific Ocean